This is part of a list of students of music, organized by teacher.

C

John Cage

Antonio Caldara

Faustino Camisani

Conrado del Campo

Ettore Campogalliani

André Campra

Christian Cannabich

Lucien Capet

Michele Carafa

Cornelius Cardew

Clive Carey

Henry Carey

Giacomo Carissimi

Gaetano Carpani

Ambrosio Carreño

Teresa Carreño

Elliott Carter

Robert Casadesus

Alfredo Casella

John Casken

Aaron Cassidy 

 Chikako Morishita

Mario Castelnuovo-Tedesco

Charles-Simon Catel

Georges Caussade

José Cayetano Carreño

Maurizio Cazzati

Sergiu Celibidache

Bohuslav Matěj Černohorský

Ignacio Cervantes

Beniamino Cesi

Joel Chadabe

George Whitefield Chadwick

Henri Challan

Jacques Champion de Chambonnières

Claude Champagne

Carlos Chávez

Luigi Cherubini

Ernst August Heinrich Chevallier

Camille Chevillard

Barney Childs

Frédéric Chopin

Alexandre-Étienne Choron

Chou Wen-chung

Hsiung-Zee Wong

John Chowning

Tatyana Chudova

Adolf Chybiński

Frederick Scotson Clark

Charles W. Clark

Johann Heinrich Clasing

Muzio Clementi

Frederic Cliffe

Helen Coates

Theodor Coccius

 (studied 1867–1869)

Philip Cogan

Jerry Coker

Randolph Coleman

Valborg Collett

Giovanni Paolo Colonna

Edward T. Cone

Paul Constantinescu

Alexis Contant

David Conte

Eugene Birman
Eric Choate
Ilya Demutsky
Ian Dicke
Joshua Fishbein
Alexander Goodhart
Peter Hilliard
Michael Kropf
Jason Martineau
Jeffrey Parola
Manly Romero

Georgi Conus

Frederick Converse

Benjamin Cooke

Francis Judd Cooke

Henry Cooke

Thomas Simpson Cooke

John Cooper

Paul Cooper

Aaron Copland

William Corbett

Frederick Corder

Paul Corder

Urbain Cordonnier

Arcangelo Corelli

Domenico Corri

Giuseppe Corsi da Celano

Alfred Cortot

Antonio Cotogni

Carlo Cotumacci

Félix Le Couppey

Ambrose Coviello

Henry Cowell

 (née Ivey; mother of Dave Brubeck)

Johann Baptist Cramer

Ruth Crawford Seeger

Girolamo Crescentini

Paul Creston

William Crotch

Connie Crothers

George Crumb

Dimitrie Cuclin

César Cui

G. D. Cunningham

Maria Curcio

Dame

Alvin Curran

Clifford Curzon

Chaya Czernowin 

 Ann Cleare

Carl Czerny

D

Ingolf Dahl

Émile Jaques-Dalcroze

Benjamin Dale

Jeremy Dale Roberts

Gennaro D'Alessandro

Luigi Dallapiccola

Leopold Damrosch

Charles Dancla

Jean-Yves Daniel-Lesur

Edward Dannreuther

Innocenz Danzi

Joseph Daussoigne-Méhul

Ferdinand David

Johann Nepomuk David

Mario Davidovsky

Peter Maxwell Davies

Anthony Davis

Walford Davies

Karl Davydov

Arthur De Greef

John de Lancie

Claude Debussy

Émile Decombes

Jean-Baptiste Dehesse

Siegfried Dehn

Michel Richard Delalande

Louis Delaquerrière

Carmine de Laurentiis

Dorothy DeLay

Léo Delibes

Enrico Delle Sedie

Isabelle Delorme

David Del Tredici

Claude Delvincourt

Norman Demuth

Edison Denisov

Edward Joseph Dent

Ludwig Deppe

Sister 

Sir

Viktor Derevianko

Lucette Descaves

Henri Desmarets

Roger Désormière

Josquin des Prez

Felix Otto Dessoff

Max Deutsch

Orpha-F. Deveaux

Jean Devémy

David Diamond

Emma Lou Diemer

Louis Diémer

Vincent d'Indy

Carl Ditters von Dittersdorf

Andrzej Dobrowolski

Ernst von Dohnányi

Jakob van Domselaer

Franco Donatoni

William Done

Jakob Dont

Anton Door

Heinrich Dorn

Louis Dorus

Victor Dourlen

Ernesto Drangosch

Alexander Dreyschock

Jan Drozdowski

Jacob Druckman

Zbigniew Drzewiecki

Théodore Dubois

 (He died on April 4, 1701, so was probably not a pupil of Dubois (b. 1837))

 (No evidence that he studied with Dubois: see here

Alexandre Dubuque

Paul Dukas

Thomas Dunhill

Auguste Dupont

Jean-Louis Duport

Jean-Pierre Duport

Marcel Dupré

Gilbert Duprez

Sylvain Dupuis

Édouard Du Puy

Émile Durand

Francesco Durante

Maurice Duruflé

František Xaver Dušek

Jan Ladislav Dussek

Sophia Dussek

Henri Dutilleux

Alphonse Duvernoy

Antonín Dvořák

E

John Eaton

Johann Ernst Eberlin

Carl Eberwein

Clarence Eddy

Alexander Edelmann

Jean-Frédéric Edelmann

Gilles van den Eeden

İsmail Dede Efendi

Abel Ehrlich

 Chaya Czernowin

Heinrich Ehrlich

Herbert Eimert

Severin Eisenberger

Antonín Eiser

Jan Ekier

Bram Eldering

Edward Elgar

Brian Elias

Ernst Ellberg

Catharinus Elling

Józef Elsner

George Elvey

Herbert Elwell

Paul Emerich

Maurice Emmanuel

George Enescu

Gustav Engel

Julius Epstein

Donald Erb

Eduard Erdmann

Robert Erickson

Achille Errani

Paul Ertel

Nicolás Ruiz Espadero

Michele Esposito

Frank Ll. Harrison
Hamilton Harty
John F. Larchet
Frederick May
Enid Starkie

José Evangelista

Camille Everardi

F

Werner Fabricius

Lorenzo Fago

Nicola Fago

Rolande Falcinelli

Manuel de Falla

Alexander Famintsyn

Harold Farberman

Harry Farjeon

Ferenc Farkas

Antonio Farini

Sampson Williams

Ernest Farrar

Arthur Farwell

Carl Friedrich Christian Fasch

Johann Friedrich Fasch

Gabriel Fauré

André Joseph Fauvel

Amy Fay

Ilona Fehér

David Felder

Morton Feldman

Fedele Fenaroli

Francesco Feo

Donald Ferguson

Howard Ferguson

Brian Ferneyhough

François-Joseph Fétis

Paul Fetler

Pierre Février

Zdeněk Fibich

John Field

Irving Fine

Ross Lee Finney

Pietro Antonio Fiocco

Giovanni Andrea Fioroni

Rudolf Firkušný

Edwin Fischer

Johann Christian Fischer

Joseph Fischhof

Josepha von Fladt

Carl Flesch

Stanley Fletcher

Marie Mauté de Fleurville

Carlisle Floyd

Free Focke

Josef Bohuslav Foerster

Emanuel Aloys Förster

Wolfgang Fortner

Lukas Foss

Jean Fournet

Frederick A. Fox

Petronio Franceschini

Arnold Franchetti

César Franck

Friedrich Wilhelm Franke

Benjamin Frankel

Ignaz Fränzl

André von Frasunkiewicz

Vito Frazzi

Girolamo Frescobaldi

Peter Racine Fricker

Alexandro Marie Antoin Fridzeri

Carl Friedberg

 

Ruth Duncan McDonald

Arthur Friedheim

Eli Friedman

Ignaz Friedman

Fred Frith

Johannes Fritsch

Giuseppe Frugatta

Gunnar de Frumerie

Herbert Fryer

Johann Nepomuk Fuchs

 (at the Vienna Conservatory)

Teodoro Fuchs

Robert Fuchs

Leo Funtek

Beat Furrer

Johann Joseph Fux

References
Citations

Sources

 
 
 Gann, Kyle (1997). American Music in the Twentieth Century. Schirmer. .
 Green, Janet M. & Thrall, Josephine (1908). The American history and encyclopedia of music. I. Squire.
 Greene, David Mason (1985). Greene's Biographical Encyclopedia of Composers. Reproducing Piano Roll Fnd.. .
 Griffiths, Paul (2011). Modern Music and After. Oxford University Press. .
 Highfill, Philip H. (1991). A Biographical Dictionary of Actors, Actresses, Musicians, Dancers, Managers, and Other Stage Personnel in London, 1660 – 1800: S. Siddons to Thrnne. SIU Press. .
 Hinkle-Turner, Elizabeth (2006). Women Composers and Music Technology in the United States: Crossing the Line. Ashgate Publishing. .
 Hinson, Maurice (2001). Music for More than One Piano: An Annotated Guide. Indiana University Press. .
 Jones, Barrie; ed. (2014). The Hutchinson Concise Dictionary of Music. Routledge. .
 Mason, Daniel Gregory (1917). The Art of Music: A Comprehensive Library of Information for Music Lovers and Musicians. The National Society of Music. . (Related books via Google).
 McGraw, Cameron (2001). Piano Duet Repertoire: Music Originally Written for One Piano, Four Hands. Indian University. .
 
 
 Sadie, Julie Anne & Samuel, Rhian; eds. (1994). The Norton/Grove Dictionary of Women Composers. W. W. Norton & Company. .
 Saxe Wyndham, Henry & L'Epine, Geoffrey; eds. (1915). Who's who in Music: A Biographical Record of Contemporary Musicians. I. Pitman & Sons.
 Wier, Albert Ernest (1938). The Macmillan encyclopedia of music and musicians. Macmillan.

Students by teacher